The 2008 congressional elections in Nevada were held on November 4, 2008, to determine who will represent the state of Nevada in the United States House of Representatives, coinciding with the presidential election. The election coincided with the 2008 U.S. presidential election. Representatives are elected for two-year terms; those elected served in the 111th Congress from January 3, 2009 until January 3, 2011.

Nevada had three seats in the House, apportioned according to the 2000 United States Census. Its 2007–2008 congressional delegation consisted of two Republicans and one Democrat. After the election, it consisted of one Republican and two Democrats, with District 3 changing from Republican to Democratic. CQ Politics had forecasted districts 2 and 3 to be at some risk for the incumbent party.

Overview

District 1

This district covered most of the City of Las Vegas, as well as parts of North Las Vegas and parts of unincorporated Clark County.  In the general election, the incumbent Democrat Shelley Berkley defeated Republican Kenneth Wegner, a Gulf War veteran and part-time Bail Enforcement Agent.

District 2

This district covered all of Nevada except for parts of Clark County. Reno, along with surrounding Washoe County, casts about 70% of the district's vote. The 2nd District had been represented by Republicans continuously since its creation, and had been represented by Republican Dean Heller of Carson City since 2007. He defeated Democrat Jill Derby of Gardnerville, a former Nevada System of Higher Education Regent and Chair of the Nevada Democratic Party. Heller had previously defeated Derby in the 2006 election, although this time the margin of victory was 10.4%, as opposed to just 5% two years before.

District 3

This district covered the suburbs of Las Vegas, including Henderson, parts of North Las Vegas and Summerlin, and much of unincorporated Clark County. Incumbent Republican Jon Porter of Boulder City (campaign website) was considered to be at risk due to the increasingly Democratic electorate in the 3rd District. Porter lost re-election to the Democratic nominee, Nevada Senate Minority Leader Dina Titus of Las Vegas (campaign website). He was also challenged by Bob Giaquinta of the Green Party (campaign website), Floyd Fitzgibbons of the Independent American Party, Joseph P. Silvestri of the Libertarian Party (campaign website), and independent Jeffrey C. Reeves (campaign website). CQ Politics had forecasted the race as 'No Clear Favorite'.

Porter had represented the district since its creation in 2003, but he faced a tough race: he won by only 48% to 46% in 2006 against a former aide to U.S. Senate Majority Leader Harry Reid, and won by 54% in 2004. George W. Bush barely won this district with 50% to 49% for John Kerry in 2004 (CPVI=D+1). Leading Democratic candidates included Fraud Examiner Andrew Martin and Clark County prosecutor Robert Daskas, but Daskas dropped out in late April, citing family concerns. After losing their top candidate, the Democratic Party quickly recruited Titus.

References

External links
Election Center from the Nevada Secretary of State
U.S. Congress candidates for Nevada at Project Vote Smart
Nevada U.S. House Races from 2008 Race Tracker
Campaign contributions for Nevada congressional races from OpenSecrets

2008
Nevada
United States House of Representatives